Geoffrey Rose may refer to:

 Geoffrey Rose (epidemiologist) (1926–1993), British epidemiologist
 Geoffrey Rose (actor) (born 1932), English actor and novelist
 Geoffrey Rose (ophthalmologist) (born 1955), English ophthalmologist